Dean Armstrong (born April 24, 1973) is a Canadian actor, producer, and acting coach.

Early life
Armstrong was born in Owen Sound, Ontario. He attended Queen's University in Kingston, Ontario, and graduated with degrees in theater arts and education.

Career
In 2000, Armstrong appeared as the recurring character Blake in the TV series Queer as Folk. In 2005, Armstrong appeared in the Canadian premiere of Tick, Tick... Boom!

Filmography

References

External links
 
 

1973 births
Living people
Canadian male film actors
Canadian male television actors
Canadian acting coaches
Male actors from Ontario
People from Owen Sound
20th-century Canadian male actors
21st-century Canadian male actors